Incomplete Eclipse is a 1982 Czech drama film directed by Jaromil Jireš. It was entered into the 33rd Berlin International Film Festival. The film was also selected as the Czechoslovak entry for the Best Foreign Language Film at the 56th Academy Awards, but was not accepted as a nominee.

Cast
 Lucie Pátiková as Marta
 Oldřich Navrátil as Doktor Mos
 Blanka Bohdanová as Nurse
 Jana Brezinová as Mother
 Gabriela Bestáková as Marta's Sister
 Simona Stašová
 Ludmila Vostrcilová

See also
 List of submissions to the 56th Academy Awards for Best Foreign Language Film
 List of Czechoslovak submissions for the Academy Award for Best Foreign Language Film

References

External links

1982 films
Czechoslovak drama films
1980s Czech-language films
1982 drama films
Films directed by Jaromil Jireš
Czech drama films
1980s Czech films